Shannon's Mob is an Australian TV series about an Australian intelligence agency. It was the last TV series from Fauna Productions, who were responsible for Skippy the Bush Kangaroo among others.

Synopsis
FIASCO (The Federal Intelligence and Security Organisation) is a top-secret department whose existence was known only to a few and was answerable only to the Prime Minister.  Under the control of one time Scotland Yard cop Dave Shannon, the main characters were agents Andrew Blake (Robin Ramsay) and Michael Jamieson (Frank Gallacher) who often worked undercover.

Production
Production of the series took place from October 1973 to May 1974, mostly in and around Sydney.

Reception
The series did not screen until October 1975. It was not a rating success and did not sell well overseas. TV critic Don Storey wrote that "not only was Shannon's Mob Fauna's least successful production, it was one of the least remembered series of Australian television's first twenty years."

List of Episodes
Without Incident
Nothing Else To Lose
Trip To Nowhere
There Was A Man
Stock In Trade
Hotspot
When Collier Came
Mixed Doubles
Loser Takes All
The Playpen
Peace Lovers
You've Got To Have Credentials
Heart Of Oak

References

External links
Shannon's Mob at IMDb
Shannon's Mob at National Film and Sound Archive
Shannon's Mob at Australian Classic TV

Nine Network original programming
1975 Australian television series debuts
1976 Australian television series endings